Pharmaceutical Society of Great Britain v Boots Cash Chemists (Southern) Ltd [1953] EWCA Civ 6 is a famous English contract law decision on the nature of an offer. The Court held that the display of a product in a store with a price attached is not sufficient to be considered an offer, and upheld the concept of an invitation to treat.

Facts
Boots Cash Chemists had just instituted a new way for its customers to buy certain medicines. Shoppers could now pick drugs off the shelves in the chemist and then pay for them at the till. Before then, all medicines were stored behind a counter meaning a shop employee would get what was requested. The Pharmaceutical Society of Great Britain objected and argued that under the Pharmacy and Poisons Act 1933, that was an unlawful practice. Under s 18(1), a pharmacist needed to supervise at the point where "the sale is effected" when the product was one listed on the 1933 Act's schedule of poisons. The Society argued that displays of goods were an "offer" and when a shopper selected and put the drugs into their shopping basket, that was an "acceptance", the point when the "sale is effected"; as no pharmacist had supervised the transaction at this point, Boots was in breach of the Act. Boots argued that the sale was effected only at the tills.

Judgment
Both the Queen's Bench Division of the High Court and the Court of Appeal sided with Boots. They held that the display of goods was not an offer. Rather, by placing the goods into the basket, it was the customer that made the offer to buy the goods. This offer could be either accepted or rejected by the pharmacist at the cash desk. The moment of the completion of contract was at the cash desk, in the presence of the supervising pharmacist. Therefore, there was no violation of the Act.

Somervell LJ said,

Birkett LJ followed on by saying,

See also

Contract
Offer and acceptance
Invitation to treat

Notes

English agreement case law
Court of Appeal (England and Wales) cases
1953 in British law
1953 in case law
Pharmacy in the United Kingdom